Entre Ríos (Spanish: "Between the rivers") is a town in the Bolivian Tarija Department.

Location
Entre Ríos is the administrative center of Burdett O'Connor Province. The town is bordered by north-southerly mountain ranges and situated in an elongated triangular hollow of  length. It was previously called San Luis.

Climate
The average yearly temperature of Entre Ríos is 20.9 °C, the yearly precipitation of 1,300 mm appears mainly in the summer's wet season from January to March.

Population
Entre Ríos' population at the 2001 census was 2,413 and rose to circa 2,800 people in 2007. The Entre Ríos region is still one of the main settlement areas of the Guaraní people who have inhabited the Paraná Basin for millennia.

References

External links
Map of province

Populated places in Tarija Department